Jeanine Baude (18 October 1946 – 27 December 2021) was a French poet and writer, born in Eyguières. 

Baude was awarded the Prix Antonin-Artaud in 1993. She died on 27 December 2021, at the age of 75.

References

1946 births
2021 deaths
French poets
French women poets
People from Bouches-du-Rhône